Edward's swamp rat (Malacomys edwardsi) is a species of rodent in the family Muridae.
It is found in Ivory Coast, Ghana, Guinea, Liberia, Nigeria, and Sierra Leone.
Its natural habitats are subtropical or tropical moist lowland forests and subtropical or tropical moist shrubland.

References
 Boitani, L. 2004.  Malacomys edwardsi.   2006 IUCN Red List of Threatened Species.   Downloaded on 19 July 2007.

Malacomys
Mammals described in 1885
Taxonomy articles created by Polbot